The 2001 special election for Florida's 1st congressional district took place on October 16, 2001, to fill the vacancy caused by Representative Joe Scarborough's resignation. Florida's 1st congressional district was a staunchly conservative district stretching from Panama City Beach to Pensacola in the Florida Panhandle.

State Representative Jeff Miller, the Republican nominee, easily defeated Steve Briese, a financial writer and the Democratic nominee.

Democratic primary

Candidates
Steve Briese, financial writer, Army veteran
Chuck Lynch

Results

Republican primary

Candidates
Jeff Miller, Florida State Representative
Michael C. Francisco, retired Air Force Colonel
Randy Knepper, former congressional aide to Representative Earl Hutto
Bob Condon, attorney, 2000 Republican candidate for Congress
Robert "Bob" Pappas, retired Marines Colonel
Ken Revell

Results

General election

Campaign
Political commentators widely expected that Miller, who had previously represented parts of the 1st District in the state legislature, would easily triumph over Briese and John G. Ralls, Jr., a podiatrist running as an independent candidate, given the district's strong conservative lean. Nevertheless, to promote his campaign, Briese walked 100 miles across the district. He campaigned on his service in the military, which he argued was particularly important in the aftermath of the September 11 terrorist attacks, which occurred a little more than a month before the election. Given the location of seven military installations in the district, including Pensacola Naval Air Station and Eglin Air Force Base, Briese emphasized both his experience in the military and his time working as a contractor on repair projects for some of the bases. Miller, meanwhile, emphasized his support for then-President George W. Bush, saying, "Our president needs a partner in the 1st Congressional District. I am ready to be that partner." However, all three candidates announced their support for then-President George W. Bush's leadership in the War on Terror.

Ultimately, owing to the conservative nature of the district, Miller defeated Briese and Ralls in a landslide, and won his first term in Congress.

Results

References

Florida 2001 13
Florida 2001 13
2001 13 Special
Florida 13 Special
United States House of Representatives 13 Special
United States House of Representatives 2001 13